The word aeon , also spelled eon (in American and Australian English), originally meant "life", "vital force" or "being", "generation" or "a period of time", though it tended to be translated as "age" in the sense of  "ages", "forever", "timeless" or "for eternity". It is a Latin transliteration from the ancient Greek word  (ho aion), from the archaic  (aiwon) meaning "century". In Greek, it literally refers to the timespan of one hundred years. Its latest meaning is more or less similar to the Sanskrit word kalpa and Hebrew word olam.

Although the term aeon may be used in reference to a period of a thousand million years (especially in geology, cosmology and astronomy), its more common usage is for any long, indefinite period.  Aeon can also refer to the four aeons on the geologic time scale that make up the Earth's history, the Hadean, Archean, Proterozoic, and the current aeon, Phanerozoic.

Astronomy and cosmology
In astronomy an aeon is defined as a billion years (109 years, abbreviated AE).
 
Roger Penrose uses the word aeon to describe the period between successive and cyclic Big Bangs within the context of conformal cyclic cosmology.

Philosophy and mysticism

In Buddhism, an "aeon" or mahakalpa (Sanskrit: महाकल्प) is often said to be 1,334,240,000 years, the life cycle of the world.

Plato used the word aeon to denote the eternal world of ideas, which he conceived was "behind" the perceived world, as demonstrated in his famous allegory of the cave.

According to Christian universalism, the Greek New Testament scriptures use the word aión (αἰών) to mean a long period and the word  to mean "during a long period"; Thus there was a time before the aeons, and the aeonian period is finite. After each person's mortal life ends, they are judged worthy of aeonian life or aeonian punishment. That is, after the period of the aeons, all punishment will cease and death is overcome and then God becomes the all in each one. This contrasts with the conventional Christian belief in eternal life and eternal punishment.

Occultists of the Thelema and O.T.O. (English: "Order of the Temple of the East") traditions sometimes speak of a "magical Aeon" that may last for perhaps as little as 2,000 years.

Aeon may also be an archaic name for omnipotent beings, such as gods.

Gnosticism

In the different systems these emanations are differently named, classified, and described, but the emanation theory itself is common to all forms of Gnosticism.

In the Basilidian Gnosis they are called sonships; according to Marcus, they are numbers and sounds; in Valentinianism they form male/female pairs called "" (Greek , from  ).

See also

 Aion (deity)
 
 Kalpa (aeon)
 
 Saeculum – comparable Latin concept

References

Concepts in metaphysics
Latin words and phrases
New Testament Greek words and phrases
Neoplatonism
Theories in ancient Greek philosophy
Time
Units of time